Michael Christopher Grieco (born September 21, 1975) is an American attorney and politician. A Democrat, Grieco has served in the Florida House of Representatives since 2018, representing the 113th district.

Early life and education 
Grieco was born in New York City on September 21, 1975, and was raised on Long Island. He attended American University in Washington, D.C., receiving a bachelor of arts degree in 1997. In the same year, Grieco moved to Florida in order to attend the University of Miami, where he received a juris doctor degree in 1999.

Early career 
After having been accepted into the Florida Bar, Grieco began his career as an assistant state attorney of Miami-Dade County, serving under Katherine Fernandez Rundle.

In 2006, Grieco moved to Miami Beach and began his own private practice as a criminal defense attorney, founding the law firm Michael Grieco Law Center.

Political career

Miami Beach city commissioner 
In 2013, Grieco ran for the Miami Beach city commission, running in District 2 against incumbent Jorge Exposito. In the nonpartisan primary held on November 5, 2013, Grieco received 35% of the vote, placing second behind Exposito, who received 45% of the vote. However, since no candidate received a majority of the vote, a runoff election was held on November 19, 2013, in which Grieco narrowly defeated Exposito, receiving 54% of the vote to Exposito's 46%.

In 2017, Grieco ran for mayor of Miami Beach to replace term-limited mayor Philip Levine. Greico was an early frontrunner, alongside former state senator Dan Gelber. However, on June 6, 2017, the Miami Herald reported that a political action committee named People for Better Leaders raised over $200,000 for the mayoral election. Grieco initially denied any association with the PAC, and called the Miami Herald investigation fake news; however, the PAC was found to be tied to him via his handwriting on documents, and a string of donors, including high-profile Miami Beach vendors, developers, and lobbyists, who testified that Grieco solicited their donations. The PAC was founded and led by Brian Abraham, a Coral Gables strip club manager, and Brian George, a bankrupted accountant, both associates of Grieco. Rundle, the Miami-Dade state attorney, began a criminal corruption probe regarding Grieco's association with the PAC.

In late July 2017, Grieco dropped out of the mayoral election, opting instead to run for re-election to the city commission. However, on September 25, Grieco dropped his bid for re-election as well. During the investigation, prosecutors discovered that one of the people who donated to Grieco's PAC was Petter Hagland, a Norwegian millionaire who donated $25,000 to the PAC. The donation, made in the name of Tony Rodriguez-Tellaheche, a Miami Beach realtor and Grieco associate, violated both Florida law, which makes it illegal to donate money to a political campaign in another person's name, and federal campaign finance law, which disallows foreign nationals from financially contributing to American elections.

On October 27, 2017, Grieco resigned from the Miami Beach city commission. Later that day, he appeared in court and pleaded no contest to the misdemeanor charge of violating campaign finance law. Judge Samuel Slom sentenced Grieco to 1 year of probation, barred him from holding elected office during his probation period, and ordered him to pay a fine of $6,000. On May 1, 2018, Grieco's probation was terminated 6 months early.

Florida state representative 
On May 4, 2018, just three days after the end of his probation, Grieco announced his candidacy for the 113th district in the Florida House of Representatives, seeking to replace retiring Democrat David Richardson. Grieco easily defeated Republican J. P. Parker, a lawyer, in the general election receiving 62% of the vote to Parker's 38.

In May 2020, allegations arose that while serving as the defense attorney for Quinton Dunbar, a Seattle Seahawks cornerback, regarding an armed robbery charge, Grieco allegedly paid off the victims and witnesses. Grieco denied these allegations, and the Miramar Police Department and the Florida Department of Law Enforcement began an investigation regarding the alleged witness tampering. Both agencies found no clear evidence that Grieco had paid off the victims. However, in July 2020, the Florida Bar opened an investigation into Grieco regarding both the witness tampering allegations and the previous campaign finance charge, which could lead to Grieco being disbarred.

Grieco ran for re-election in 2020, and won a second term unopposed.

Campaign for State Senate
On November 14, Grieco filed to run for Senate District 37 likely going against incumbent Ileana Garcia. The district will shrink to cover only a portion of Miami-Dade County’s coast, including parts of Miami, Miami Beach, Coral Gables, Sweetwater and West Miami. On June 1, Grieco posted on social media that he was dropping out of the race for SD-37 citing a lack of funds from various organizations and a reluctance from these groups to back his campaign. Grieco also stated he would not run for another term for his house seat.

References

Grieco, Michael
Living people
21st-century American politicians
1975 births
People from Miami Beach, Florida